Sadiqabad (Punjabi/) is a city and capital of Sadiqabad Tehsil in Rahim Yar Khan District, Punjab province of Pakistan. It is situated at the border of Sindh and Punjab. According to the 2017 Census of Pakistan, it is the 32nd  largest city of Pakistan with a population of 238,313.

History 
Sadiqabad is a Tehsil of Rahimyar Khan District, is named after Sadeq Mohammad Khan V of Bahawalpur State. The new city was inaugurated in 1948.

Sadiqabad boat sinking

See also
State of Bahawalpur

References

External links
 
 

Populated places in Rahim Yar Khan District